Rhytida meesoni is a species of small, air-breathing land snail, a terrestrial pulmonate gastropod mollusc in the family Rhytididae.

Subspecies 
 Rhytida meesoni meesoni Suter, 1891 South Island
 Rhytida meesoni perampla Powell, 1946 South Island

Distribution 
This species occurs in New Zealand

Life cycle 
Dimensions of a group of eggs of Rhytida meesoni were 2.75 × 2.5, 2.75 × 2.25, 2.5 × 2.25, 2.5 × 2, 2.25 × 2 mm.

References

Rhytida
Gastropods described in 1891
Gastropods of New Zealand
Endemic fauna of New Zealand
Endemic molluscs of New Zealand